GNU E is an extension of C++ designed for writing software systems to
support  persistent applications. It was designed as part of the
Exodus project.

External links 

 GNU E software and papers
 Exodus Storage Manager

C++